Julie K. White (born June 4, 1961) is an American actress. She won the Tony Award for Best Actress in a Play for her performance in The Little Dog Laughed in 2007. She has also received three other Tony Award nominations for her performances in Airline Highway in 2013, Gary: A Sequel to Titus Andronicus in 2019 and POTUS: Or, Behind Every Great Dumbass Are Seven Women Trying to Keep Him Alive in 2022. She played Sam Witwicky's mother in Transformers film series (2007-2011)

She is also known for her television roles, including Nadine Swoboda in Chuck Lorre created ABC sitcom Grace Under Fire (1993-1998) as well as guest appearances on Six Feet Under, Desperate Housewives, Nurse Jackie and The Good Wife. She has also appeared in such films  as Michael Clayton (2007), Lincoln (2012) and A Very Murray Christmas (2015).

Personal life
White was born in the Balboa Naval Hospital in San Diego, California, the daughter of Sue Jane (née Terry), a therapist, and Edwin White, a dentist. White and her family moved to Austin, Texas, to take up ranching when she was three years old. She started acting in local plays and became a semi-professional at 16. While she was playing the lead role in the musical The Baker's Wife, the show's authors encouraged her to take her talent to New York City.

After graduating from high school, she attended Southwest Texas State University (now known as Texas State University) and then attended Fordham University as an English major, although she did not graduate. White married Carl Pandel in 1984; they divorced in 1990.

Career
White has been a prolific stage actress, getting her start in regional theatre. Some of her regional theater credits include On the Verge at the Huntington Theatre Company, Boston, Massachusetts, 1985–1986, Largo desolato at the Yale Repertory Theatre, New Haven, Connecticut, 1990–1991, Marvin's Room at Seattle Repertory Theatre in January 1992, Absurd Person Singular in 1993 at the Long Wharf Theatre,  Money and Friends by David Williamson at the UCLA James A. Doolittle Theatre, Hollywood, California, presented by the Center Theatre Group/Ahmanson in January to March 1993.

White made her Off-Broadway debut in Lucky Stiff in 1988 at Playwrights Horizons. She appeared in Just Say No (1988) and in the Off-Broadway WPA Theatre production of Early One Evening At the Rainbow Bar and Grille (1989) by Bruce Graham. She appeared in The Stick Wife by Darrah Cloud produced by the Manhattan Theatre Club at Stage II in 1991.

She appeared in Michael John LaChiusa's Over Texas, presented as part of the Ensemble Studio Theater's Marathon in 1991.

She appeared at the Off-Broadway Second Stage production of the Theresa Rebeck play Spike Heels with Kevin Bacon and Tony Goldwyn in 1992. Frank Rich wrote: "Julie White makes a far more vivid impression. Rail-thin but with a broad face and features, this actress has an off-center style and piquant wit that make her a natural for high comedy of this or any other period." White appeared in a one-woman show, Theresa Rebeck's Bad Dates, written especially for her. The play premiered Off-Broadway at Playwrights Horizons in June 2003.

On Broadway, White appeared in Wendy Wasserstein's Pulitzer Prize-winning play, The Heidi Chronicles, as a replacement. She also appeared in the made-for-television movie of The Heidi Chronicles, which aired in 1995.

In 2006, she appeared Off-Broadway in The Little Dog Laughed by Douglas Carter Beane, playing Diane, a screen agent, who, as one critic put it, is "a Mephistopheles in Manolos". The show transferred to Broadway in October 2006 with a new cast, including former Grace Under Fire costar Tom Everett Scott. She won the Tony Award for Best Performance by a Leading Actress in a Play for her performance.

White played Nadine, the quirky neighbor on Grace Under Fire. White joined the show when it launched in 1993 and appeared in the first four seasons. However, she did not appear in the show's final season. Her departure was attributed to conflict with the show's star, Brett Butler.

White has subsequently made several guest appearances on HBO's Six Feet Under as Mitzi Dalton-Huntley and on NBC's Law & Order: Special Victims Unit as Dr. Anne Morella. White also appeared on Desperate Housewives as Amanda in the Season Two finale but chose to turn down a recurring role when she was offered the role in The Little Dog Laughed. She plays Judy Witwicky, mother of the main human character Sam Witwicky, in Transformers and its sequels, Transformers: Revenge of the Fallen and Transformers: Dark of the Moon. White appeared in the ABC sitcom Cavemen in 2007.

In 2008, White received a Drama Desk Award nomination as Outstanding Actress in a Play for her role in the play From Up Here.

In 2009, she appeared in the HBO original movie Taking Chance starring Kevin Bacon. She also lent her voice to the 2009 computer-animated film Monsters vs. Aliens.

White has served several times as a guest judge on the reality TV series Iron Chef America. White stepped into the role of Masha, originated by Sigourney Weaver, in Christopher Durang's play Vanya and Sonia and Masha and Spike, on Broadway, from July 28 to August 25, 2013, at the Golden Theatre.

In 2013, White was a series regular on Amazon's Alpha House, a political comedy series written by Doonesbury creator Garry Trudeau. White plays Maddie Biggs, the wife of North Carolina Senator Gil John Biggs, played by John Goodman. White will also appear in the show's second season, which is filming over the summer of 2014.

In 2014 she joined the cast of the Showtime television drama Nurse Jackie for its sixth season.

She appeared on Broadway at the Samuel J. Friedman Theatre in the Manhattan Theatre Club production of the Lisa D'Amour play Airline Highway in April 2015 to June 2015. White was nominated for the 2015 Drama Desk Award, Outstanding Featured Actress in a Play and the 2015 Tony Award, Featured Actress in a Play. Later in 2015, she played Kate opposite Matthew Broderick and Annaleigh Ashford in Sylvia at the Cort Theatre.

In July 2017, White took over the role of Nora in A Doll's House, Part 2 at the John Golden Theatre on Broadway, succeeding Laurie Metcalf.

In 2018, White was cast in a recurring role in the third season of Netflix's Designated Survivor as Lorraine Zimmer.

In 2019, White joined the cast of Gary: A Sequel to Titus Andronicus at the Booth Theatre on Broadway. An unexpected injury had forced Andrea Martin, the original star, to not be able to continue the show. Kristine Nielsen took over Martin's role, and White took over Nielsen's role, with only a few extra days for rehearsal. Both women were rewarded with Tony Award nominations for Featured Actress in a Play for their performances.

In 2022, White was cast in the role of Helen Smallwood on the CBS sitcom How We Roll.

Filmography

Film
Sources:

Television
Source:

Theatre

Awards and nominations

References

External links

 
 
 
 
 BroadwayWorld Article: "Julie White to Star in 'From Up Here' at MTC"

Living people
American film actresses
American stage actresses
American television actresses
American voice actresses
Fordham University alumni
Actresses from Austin, Texas
Actresses from San Diego
Tony Award winners
20th-century American actresses
21st-century American actresses
1961 births